Dilmurat is a Uyghur name that may refer to the following notable people:
Dilmurat Mawlanyaz (born 1998), Chinese footballer of Uyghur ethnicity
Dilraba Dilmurat (born 1992), Chinese actress, singer and model of Uyghur ethnicity

Uyghur-language surnames
Uyghur given names